Let's Go for a Drive! is a book by Mo Willems, published in 2012. It is a book in the Elephant and Piggie series.

Plot
An elephant called Gerald and a pig called Piggie want to go for a drive.  Gerald decides they need a number of items for the trip like bags, a map, sunglasses and umbrellas.  They sing as they get ready but unfortunately they don't have a car.  Gerald gets upset but then Piggie makes a suggestion, which makes everything better.

Reception
Kirkus Reviews finds that "The dauntless duo’s 18th outing employs Willems’ award-winning formula: color-coded speech bubbles; lots of white space; endearing visual characterization ... effortless phonetic play; thoughtfully designed endpapers; silliness."  Common Sense Media believes that it "...gives new readers a fun lesson in being flexible."

Awards
 Geisel Award runner-up 2013

References

2012 children's books
American children's books
American picture books
Children's fiction books
Books about elephants
Books about pigs
Children's books about friendship